This is a list of films which have placed number one at the box office in Australia during 2021.

Highest-grossing films

References

See also
List of Australian films – Australian films by year
2021 in film

External links

2021
Australia
2021 in Australian cinema